Sultan Ageng Tirtayasa University (abbreviated as Untirta) is the only state university in the province of Banten, Indonesia. The main campus is in Serang Regency, the faculty of engineering is at Cilegon, and Faculty of Education most of it is located in Ciwaru Serang. Sultan Ageng Tirtayasa University was established by the Tirtayasa Foundation.

Untirta has seven faculties: Law, Teacher Training and Education, Engineering, Agriculture, Economics, Social & Political Science, and Medicine.

Sultan Ageng Tirtayasa University is the youngest public university in Indonesia.

History 
In 1984, Tirtayasa Education Foundation had the College of Law, College of Teacher Training and Education, and College of Technology; a decree by the Ministry of Culture and Education changed their status to Faculty of Law, Faculty of Teacher Training and Education and Faculty of Engineering. All faculties were determined by the listed status as faculty at Sultan Ageng Tirtayasa University. Then Untirta developed with the establishment of the Faculty of Agriculture and Faculty of Economics, with listed status.

On October 13, 1999, the decree of the President of the Republic of Indonesia set about preparation of establishment of the Sultan Ageng Tirtayasa University as a Public University. On March 19, 2001, Sultan Ageng Tirtayasa University became state university in the Ministry of National Education.

Faculties

Faculty of Engineering 
  Industrial Engineering
  Civil Engineering
  Electrical Engineering
  Metallurgical Engineering
  Chemical Engineering
  Mechanical Engineering
  Informatics

Faculty of Medicine 
  Medical Education
  Nutrition Science
  Nursing
  Sport Science

Faculty of Education and Teacher Training 
  Mathematics Education
  Biology Education
  Non Formal Education
  Indonesian Literature and Language Education
  English Education
  Early Childhood Education
  Primary School Teachers Education
  Special Education
  Guidance and Counseling
  Physics Education
  Chemistry Education
  Natural Science Education
  Electrical Engineering Education
  Mechanical Engineering Education
  Citizen and Pancasila Education
  Socioogy Education
  History Education
  Education in Art Drama Dance and Music

Faculty of Agriculture 
  Social Economics of Agriculture / Agribusiness
  Agroecotechnology
  Fishery
  Food Technology

Faculty of Social and Political Sciences 
  Communication Science
  State Administration
  Government Science

Faculty of Law 
  Law Science

Faculty of Economic and Business 
  Accounting
  Management
  Economic Development
  Sharia Economics

Diploma 
  Accounting
  Taxation
  Finance and Banking
  Marketing
  Nursing

Postgraduates 
  Accounting
  Public Administration
  Law Science
  Agricultural Science
  Management
  Indonesian Education
  Mathematics Education
  English Education
  Learning Technology
  Chemical Engineering

Campuses

Pakupatan Campus 
This was the main campus before the Sindangsari Campus is inaugurated in 2021. Pakupatan Campus is located on KM 4 Jl. Raya Jakarta, Pakupatan, Cipocok Jaya District, Serang City, Banten Province. This campus now is for Diploma degree and Postraduate School.

Cilegon Campus 

This Campus has two faculties, The Faculty of Engineering and Faculty of Medicine. Cilegon Campus is on KM 3 Jl. Jenderal Sudirman, Cilegon, Banten Province.

Ciwaru Campus 
Ciwaru Campus for Faculty of Education and Teacher Training. The faculty has 18 study programs.  The campus is located on Jl. Raya Ciwaru No. 25, Ciwaru, Cipare District, Serang City, Banten Province.

Kepandean Campus 
This campus for study program of Diploma 3 Nursing, Faculty of Medicine. Located on Jl. Letnan Jidun No. 2, Kepandean, Serang City, Banten Province.

Sindangsari Campus 
Sindangsari Campus is the new campus and become the main campus for Untirta since 2021. Located on Km 3 Jl. Palka, Sindangsari, Pabuaran District, Serang Regency, Banten Province. Four faculties are located in here:
 • Faculty of Law
 • Faculty of Agriculture
 • Faculty of Economics and Business
 • Faculty of Social and Political Science

World rankings

Accreditation 
The main function of the National Accreditation Agency for Higher Education is to support the Minister of National Education in assessing the quality of higher education.

This is the accreditation status of courses at Sultan Ageng Tirtayasa University (as of 2019).

Faculty of Engineering

Faculty of Teacher Training and Education Science

Faculty of Agriculture

Faculty of Social and Political Science

Faculty of Law

Faculty of Economics

Untirta Social Network
Sultan Ageng Tirtayasa University has social networking called Untirta Network dedicated to all in the academic community or anyone associated with the university.

References

  Sultan Ageng Tirtayasa University (Untirta)
  Faculty of Engineering Untirta
  National Accreditation Agency for Higher Education (Blog)

External links
  Sultan Ageng Tirtayasa State University
  Faculty of Engineering Untirta
  Faculty of Agriculture
  Faculty of Social Sciences and Political Science
  Untirta Student Affairs
  LPPM Untirta
  Internal Supervisor Unit Untirta
  I-mhere Untirta

Universities in Indonesia
Universities in Banten
Indonesian state universities